Croatia competed at the 2014 Summer Youth Olympics, in Nanjing, China from 16 August to 28 August 2014. Croatia had 24 athletes qualified in 13 sports.

Medalists
Medals awarded to participants of mixed-NOC (Combined) teams are represented in italics. These medals are not counted towards the individual NOC medal tally.

Athletics

Croatia qualified one athlete.

Qualification Legend: Q=Final A (medal); qB=Final B (non-medal); qC=Final C (non-medal); qD=Final D (non-medal); qE=Final E (non-medal)

Girls
Field events

Badminton

Croatia qualified one athlete based on the Badminton Junior World Rankings.

Singles

Doubles

Boxing

Croatia qualified three athletes based on its performance at the 2014 Youth World Boxing Championships.

Boys

Fencing

Croatia qualified one athlete at the 2014 World Cadet Championships.

Boys

Mixed Team

Gymnastics

Artistic Gymnastics

Croatia qualified one athlete based on its performance at the 2014 European MAG Championships.

Boys

Judo

Croatia qualified two athletes based on its performance at the 2013 Cadet World Judo Championships.

Individual

Team

Rowing

Croatia qualified two boats. The boys' pairs qualified from the 2013 World Rowing Junior Championships and the girls' single sculls was reallocated to Croatia as an unused quota.

Qualification Legend: FA=Final A (medal); FB=Final B (non-medal); FC=Final C (non-medal); FD=Final D (non-medal); SA/B=Semifinals A/B; SC/D=Semifinals C/D; R=Repechage

Sailing

Croatia qualified one boat based on its performance at the 2013 World Byte CII Championships. Croatia also received a reallocated quota place in girls' Byte CII class.

Shooting

Croatia qualified two shooters based on its performance at the 2014 European Shooting Championships.

Individual

Team

Swimming

Croatia qualified three swimmers.

Boys

Girls

Table tennis

Croatia qualified one athlete based on its performance at the European Qualification Event. Later, Croatia qualified another athlete at the Road to Nanjing series.

Singles

Team

Qualification Legend: Q=Main Bracket (medal); qB=Consolation Bracket (non-medal)

Taekwondo

Croatia qualified two athletes based on its performance at the Taekwondo Qualification Tournament.

Girls

Tennis

Croatia qualified one athlete based on the ITF ranking.

Singles

Doubles

References

2014 in Croatian sport
Nations at the 2014 Summer Youth Olympics
Croatia at the Youth Olympics